Richard William Heinberg is an American journalist and educator who has written extensively on energy, economic, and ecological issues, including oil depletion.  He is the author of 14 books, and presently serves as the senior fellow at the Post Carbon Institute.

Early life 
Heinberg grew up in  St. Joseph, Missouri. His father, William Heinberg, was a chemist and high-school physics and chemistry teacher. Heinberg's interest in science came from his father, but at an early age, he rejected his parents' fundamentalist Christian beliefs. At one point he lived at Colorado's Sunrise Ranch, headquarters of the " Emissaries of Divine Light" group, which Heinberg referred to as "a sort of benign cult."

Career
After two years in college and a period of personal study, in November 1979 Heinberg became personal assistant to Immanuel Velikovsky. After Velikovsky's death, Heinberg assisted his widow in editing manuscripts. He published his first book in 1989, Memories and Visions of Paradise: Exploring the Universal Myth of a Lost Golden Age, which was the result of ten years of study of world mythology. An expanded second edition was published in 1995. He began publishing his alternative newsletter, the MuseLetter, in 1992.  His next book – published in 1993 – was Celebrate the Solstice: Honoring the Earth's Seasonal Rhythms through Festival and Ceremony.

In June 1995, speaking to the International Society for the Comparative Study of Civilizations in Dayton, Ohio, Heinberg provided "A Primitivist Critique of Civilization" and discussed the ways in which "we are, it would seem, killing the planet." 

In February 2007, Heinberg addressed the Committee on International Trade of the European Parliament and served as an advisor to the National Petroleum Council in its report to the U.S. Secretary of Energy on Peak Oil. In October 2007, the Green Party of Aotearoa organised a speaking tour of New Zealand for Heinberg, which included a presentation in the Beehive theatrette within the New Zealand Parliament building. In 2008 he was a Mayor's appointed member of the Oil Independent Oakland 2020 Task Force (Oakland, California), which was convened to chart a path for the city to dramatically reduce its petroleum dependence.

Heinberg is now the Senior Fellow of the Post Carbon Institute in Santa Rosa, California. He is also a violinist, illustrator, and book designer. He is married to Janet Barocco.

Heinberg has proposed an international protocol to peak oil management with the aim of reducing the impact of the arrival of the peak. The adoption of the Protocol would mean that oil-importing nations should deal to reduce their importations in an annual percentage, while exporting countries should deal to reduce their exportations in the same percentage. The Uppsala Protocol has been focused in a similar direction.

Heinberg is the editor of MuseLetter, which has been included in Utne Magazine's annual list of Best Alternative Newsletters. He has appeared in the documentaries Once You Know,The End of Suburbia, The 11th Hour, Crude Impact, Oil, Smoke & Mirrors, Chasing God, What a Way to Go: Life at the End of Empire, The Great Squeeze, The Power of Community: How Cuba Survived Peak Oil, A Farm for the Future and Ripe For Change.

Heinberg serves on the advisory board of The Climate Mobilization, a grassroots advocacy group calling for a national economic mobilization against climate change on the scale of the home front during World War II, with the goal of 100% clean energy and net zero greenhouse gas emissions by 2025.

Heinberg is one of the more moderate commentators on peak oil (compared with others like James Howard Kunstler.)

Books 
Heinberg's books from the later 1990s address the relationships between humanity and the natural world. In 1998, he began teaching at New College of California in the "Culture, Ecology and Sustainable Community" program, which he helped design. He remained a member of the Core Faculty until 2007, when the College closed its doors. His book The Party's Over: Oil, War, and the Fate of Industrial Societies, published in 2003, was one of the first full-length analyses of peak oil.

In 2004, Heinberg provided the closing address for the First US Conference on Peak Oil and Community Solutions.  His title was "Beyond the Peak."

Publications
 Memories and Visions of Paradise: Exploring the Universal Myth of a Lost Golden Age (1989; revised edition, 1995; British edition, 1990; Portuguese edition, 1991)
 Celebrate the Solstice: Honoring the Earth’s Seasonal Rhythms through Festival and Ceremony (1993; Italian edition, 2002; Portuguese edition, 2002)
 A New Covenant with Nature: Notes on the End of Civilization and the Renewal of Culture (1996; Portuguese edition, 1998)  
 Cloning the Buddha: The Moral Impact of Biotechnology (1999; Indian edition, 2001; Japanese edition, 2001; Chinese edition, 2001)
 The Party's Over: Oil, War, and the Fate of Industrial Societies (2003; British, Italian, German, Spanish, and Arabic editions, 2004–2005; revised North American edition, 2005; Spanish edition, 2007; French edition, 2008 German Edition)
 Powerdown: Options and Actions for a Post-Carbon World (2004; British edition 2005)
 The Oil Depletion Protocol: A Plan to Avert Oil Wars, Terrorism and Economic Collapse (2006),
 Peak Everything: Waking Up to the Century of Declines (2007).
 Blackout: Coal, Climate, and the Last Energy Crisis (June, 2009).  
 The Post Carbon Reader: Managing the 21st Century’s Sustainability Crises, edited by Richard Heinberg & Daniel Lerch (2010) 
 The End of Growth: Adapting to Our New Economic Reality, (2011) 
 Snake Oil: How Fracking's False Promise of Plenty Imperils Our Future (2013) 
 Afterburn: Society Beyond Fossil Fuels (2015) 
 Our Renewable Future: Laying the Path for One Hundred Percent Clean Energy (2016) , co-authored by Richard Heinberg and David Fridley
 Power: Limits and Prospects for Human Survival (2021)

See also 
 Energy descent
 Oil depletion
 Peak oil
 Petrodollar warfare

References

External links

 
 
2008 interview on Global Public Media Heinberg on Post Carbon Institute's Green New Deal
 
  on the Keiser Report

Living people
American male journalists
Journalists from California
American non-fiction environmental writers
Ecological economists
People associated with criticism of economic growth
Newsletter publishers (people)
Writers from Santa Rosa, California
Activists from California
Year of birth missing (living people)